The Botswana Tennis Association (BoTA) is the national governing body for the sport of tennis in Botswana.  Botswana is  ranked in the top 15 nations in African tennis. The BoTA is affiliated to both International Tennis Federation and Confederation of African Tennis.

History 
Botswana competed in its first Fed Cup in 1995. Their best result was fourth place in its Group II pool in 2002 and 2003. Tapiwa Marobela has recorded the highest number of wins for the Botswana Fed Cup team, six wins from 13 singles matches and two wins from 11 doubles matches between 2001 and 2004, before she attended Florida State University from 2004 to 2008. Botswana competed in its first Davis Cup in 1996. Botswana Tennis Association also participated in 2014 African Youth Games held in Gaborone, Botswana.

There are thirteen tennis clubs affiliated to the association. The association collaborates with such institutions as Botswana Integrated Sports Association (Body for Secondary Schools’ sports), Botswana Premier League Sports Association (body for tertiary institutions’ sports, primary schools), etc.

Davis Cup 
Botswana Davis Cup team qualified in February 2005 for Group III after being relegated in 2002 from Group III where they had been for two years.

Human resources 
 Coaches  Fifteen (15) ITF Level I coaches have been trained through the cooperation between the ITF and the International Olympic Committee (IOC).
 OfficialsThe association has one ITF Level II (White Badge) umpire and over forty Level I umpires.
 Other volunteers include sports physicians who are called occasionally to assist at selected events, particularly international competitions.

See also 

 Sport in Botswana
 Botswana National Sports Council

References

National members of the Confederation of African Tennis
Tennis
Tennis in Botswana